"Big Girls Don't Cry" is a song written by Bob Crewe and Bob Gaudio and originally recorded by the Four Seasons. It hit number one on the Billboard Hot 100 on November 17, 1962, and, like its predecessor "Sherry", spent five weeks in the top position but never ranked in the Billboard year-end charts of 1962 or 1963. The song also made it to number one, for three weeks, on Billboard's Rhythm and Blues survey.  It was also the quartet's second single to make it to number one on the US R&B charts.

Background
According to Gaudio, he was dozing off while watching the John Payne/Rhonda Fleming/Ronald Reagan movie Tennessee's Partner when he heard Payne's character slap Fleming in the face. After the slap, Fleming's character replied, "Big girls don't cry." Gaudio wrote the line on a scrap of paper, fell asleep, and wrote the song the next morning. However, the line does not appear in that film.  According to Bob Crewe, he was dozing off in his Manhattan home with the television on when he awoke to see Payne manhandling Fleming in Slightly Scarlet, a 1956 film noir based on a James M. Cain story. The line is heard in that film.

Like "Sherry", the lead in "Big Girls Don't Cry" is sung mostly in falsetto. With this song, the Four Seasons became the first rock-era act to hit the number one spot on the Hot 100 with their first two chart entries (their first single, "Bermuda"/"Spanish Lace", did not appear on any Billboard chart in 1961).

Personnel
Partial credits.

The Four Seasons
 Frankie Valli – lead vocals, handclaps
 Tommy DeVito – harmony and backing vocals, guitar, handclaps
 Nick Massi – harmony and backing vocals, bass, handclaps
 Bob Gaudio – harmony and backing vocals, piano, handclaps
Additional musician and production staff
 Panama Francis – drums
 Bob Crewe – producer
 Bruce Swedien – engineer

Charts

Weekly charts

All-time charts

References

External links
 Lyrics of this song

1962 songs
1962 singles
Billboard Hot 100 number-one singles
Cashbox number-one singles
The Four Seasons (band) songs
Songs written by Bob Crewe
Songs written by Bob Gaudio
Vee-Jay Records singles
Song recordings produced by Bob Crewe